Below are the rosters of the teams that participated in the 1999 Copa América.

Group A

Bolivia

Head coach:  Héctor Veira

Japan

Head coach:  Philippe Troussier

Paraguay

Head coach: Ever Almeida

Peru

Head coach: Juan Carlos Oblitas

Group B

Brazil

Head coach: Vanderlei Luxemburgo

Chile

Head coach:  Nelson Acosta

Mexico

Head coach:  Manuel Lapuente

Venezuela

Head coach:  José Omar Pastoriza

Group C

Argentina

Head coach: Marcelo Bielsa

Colombia

Head coach:

Ecuador

Head coach: Carlos Sevilla

Uruguay

Head coach: Víctor Púa

References

RSSSF

1999 Copa América
Copa América squads